Serhiy Kovhanko (born March 23, 1974) is a boxer from Ukraine, who won the bronze medal in the Men's Flyweight (– 48 kg) division at the 1996 European Amateur Boxing Championships in Vejle, Denmark.

Kovganko represented his native country at the 1996 Summer Olympics in Atlanta, Georgia. There he was stopped in the second round of the Men's Flyweight division by Kazakhstan's eventual silver medalist Bulat Jumadilov.

References
 sports-reference

1974 births
Living people
Flyweight boxers
Boxers at the 1996 Summer Olympics
Olympic boxers of Ukraine
Ukrainian male boxers
Sportspeople from Mykolaiv